Flame is an album by Irish folk singer Johnny Duhan, which was released in 1996.

Track listing
 "In The Afterbirth"
 "The Blight"
 "Flame"
 "Face The Night"
 "After The Dream"
 "Captain"
 "On The Water"
 "My Father Was A Sailor"
 "The Beacon"
 "When You Go"

References

External links
 [ Allmusic]
 Irishmusicmail.com
 Amazon.com
 Homepage

1996 albums
Johnny Duhan albums